{{safesubst:#invoke:RfD||2=Torah-submission|month = February
|day = 28
|year = 2023
|time = 21:44
|timestamp = 20230228214418

|content=
REDIRECT Christian views on the Old Covenant

}}